Gabkhan Channel is a canal connecting Pirojpur District of Bangladesh with Jhalakati District. This canal length is 18 kilometers.

It is known as the Suez Canal of Bangladesh, starting from Kawkhali near the village of Ashoa.

References

Barishal Division